Darıca Half Marathon is an international athletic event that takes place in Darıca town of Kocaeli Province annually since 2011. The half marathon is organized in October. Master men and women divisions, as well as a  fun run are held during the event.

The first half marathon took place on September 25, 2011 with 460 male and 90 female athletes. At the event held on October 6, 2013, 1,150 registered athletes from 15 nations took part. The fun run was performed by around 4,000 participants.

The total money prize is Us$50,000 while the male and female winners receive US$5,000, the runners-up US$3,000 and the third placed athletes US$2,000 etc. respectively.

Winners
Key:

References

Half marathons in Turkey
Sport in Darıca
2011 establishments in Turkey
Annual events in Turkey
Recurring sporting events established in 2011
Autumn events in Turkey